Tuweep is a ghost town in Mohave County, Arizona, United States.

References

External links
 
 

Ghost towns in Arizona
Former populated places in Mohave County, Arizona